The Helderberg Group is a geologic group that outcrops in the State New York, Pennsylvania, Maryland New Jersey and West Virginia. It also is present subsurface in Ohio and the Canadian Providence of Ontario It preserves fossils dating back to the Early Devonian and Late Silurian period. The name was coined by T.A Conrad, 1839 in the New York State Geological Survey Annual Report. Named for the Helderberg Escarpment or Helderberg Mountains.

The Upper portion of the Helderberg, or the Kalkberg Formation is host to the Bald Hill ash bed, dated to 417.6 million years ago.

The Helderberg is comprised chiefly of Limestone and Dolomite.

See also

 List of fossiliferous stratigraphic units in New York

References

 

Geologic groups of New York (state)